Hà Tiên is a Provincial city in Kiên Giang Province, Mekong Delta in Vietnam. The city borders Cambodia to the west. Hà Tiên is a tourist site of the region thanks to its beaches and landscapes.

Etymology
The name "Hà Tiên" is derived from the Sino-Vietnamese word: 河僊 or 河仙, meaning "river spirit".

History
 

A settlement and a port seem to have existed at the site of the present town of Hà Tiên from a very early period. Ptolemy's Geography identified a town there as Akadra and that it was the port for the Cambodian district of Pithonobaste - Banteay Meas, all this being part of the Kingdom of Funan. The local capital of this district, also called Banteay Meas, was not on the coast, but located about a day's journey up the Giang-thành river. The name Banteay Meas, (lit: "golden ramparts"), referred to the bamboo fortifications once used about the town. The town of Hà Tiên was originally known under the Khmer, name of Piem or Peam (also Pie, Pam, Bam), the Khmer for "port", "harbour" or "river mouth", while the Vietnamese called it Mang-Kham, from the Vietnamese term for the Khmers, "mang". It was through this port that Buddhism is said to have reached Cambodia, brought there by chance when a ship carrying Buddhaghosa was blown there by a storm in 415 AD.

Many works incorrectly referred to Hà-Tiên as “Panthaimas", the early name of the district in which it was located. It was variously spelled as Panday-mas (Khmer), Ponteamass (English), Phutthaimat or Banthaimat, Ponthiamas or Pontheaymas (French), Pontiano (Robert's Map, 1751), Panthai-mas, Bantaimas, Pontiamas, Pontaimas, Bantay-mas, Banteay M’eas, Pontiamas, Pontiamasse, Po-taimat, and infinite other variations.

Hà Tiên was established by a small group of Chinese people, mostly men who supported the Ming Dynasty and were opposed to the Qing Dynasty, led by Mo Jiu (Mạc Cửu). When they arrived in Đàng Trong (as southern Vietnam was called while under the rule of the Nguyễn lords), the Nguyễn lords ordered the king of Cambodia (then a vassal state of Đàng Trong) to grant land to these Chinese people. These people built markets in this place and turned it into a busy business town. Vietnamese people gradually arrived there. This town later was merged into Vietnamese territory when Mo Jiu delivered its sovereignty to the Nguyễn Lords. Mo Jiu was then conferred the position of ruler of this town. It was at this time that the name Hà Tiên (河仙 - "River Spirit"), referring to the guardian deity of the Giang-thành river, was conferred on the town by the Emperor Minh Vương.

Economy
Around 22 km south of Hà Tiên is a large cement plant located in Kiên Lương. Its history goes back to the Republic of Vietnam (South Vietnam), where it was one of the largest industrial projects when construction was started in April 1961.

Transportation

Road transport
Buses connect Hà Tiên to the provincial capital Rạch Giá and many other towns in the Mekong Delta, including Châu Đốc, Can Tho, Ca Mau, Vung Tau and Saigon.

Sea transport
Daily fast ferries are available to Phú Quốc island. In the low (wet) season they normally operate twice a day - at approximately 08:00-08:30 and then 13:00-13:30 (times vary a bit according to tides/weather). In the high (dry) season they run more frequently, with up to 3 fast boats (Superdong) each making up to 3 crossings every day. The trip takes about 80–90 minutes. There are also now 4 car ferries operating from Hà Tiên to the north east corner of the island at Bai Thom. These run on demand, not to a fixed schedule and can start as early as 05:00 and run until 21:00. This takes about 2.5 hours.

Border crossing
A road border crossing between Vietnam and Cambodia, called the Hà Tiên International Border Gate, is located 7 km west of Hà Tiên in the village of Xà Xía. On the Cambodian side, the border crossing is known as the Prek Chak International Border Checkpoint in Kampong Trach District, Kampot. The border crossing was opened in 2007. It is open from 07:00 to 18:00. Besides conventional Vietnamese visas, this border crossing is also listed as a Vietnamese e-Visa point of entry for foreigners.

See also

 Kiên Giang
 Phú Quốc

References

External links

Populated places in Kiên Giang province
Populated places on the Mekong River
Districts of Kiên Giang province
Cambodia–Vietnam border crossings
Cities in Vietnam